Rhagio mystaceus, also known as the down-looker fly, downlooker snipefly and common snipe fly, is a species of fly from the family Rhagionidae.

Description
Rhagio mystaceus has an overall dark colour, with males growing to 7–9 mm, and females reaching 6–8 mm. The thorax has three dark dorsal stripes. Normally, the center stripe has a very thin, pale line running down the middle. On the abdomen, there are yellowish rings at the posterior of the segments. However, the basal segment on some specimens are mostly yellowish and have a black dorsal and lateral spot.

The wing are patterned with dark tips.

References

External links
 
 Images
 Images

Rhagionidae
Diptera of North America
Insects described in 1840
Taxa named by Pierre-Justin-Marie Macquart